The Hellenic Swimming Federation founded in 1927, is the aquatics national federation for Greece. It oversees competition in 4 Olympic aquatic sports (swimming, synchronized swimming, diving and water polo).

It is affiliated to:

FINA, the International Swimming Federation
LEN, the European Swimming League
HOC, the Hellenic Olympic Committee.

See also
Greece men's national water polo team
Greece women's national water polo team
List of Greek records in swimming

References

External links
Official website

Greece
Swimming in Greece
Aquatics
Greece
Greece